The 1998–99 Druga HNL was the 8th season of Druga HNL, the second level league in Croatian football.

The format of the league was changed and the five regional subdivisions which composed the Druga HNL in the 1997–98 season were merged into a single nationwide format for the 1998–99 season. A total of 19 clubs competed in Druga HNL this season, in a double round-robin format.

Clubs

League table

See also
1998–99 Prva HNL
1998–99 Croatian Cup

External links
1998–99 in Croatian Football at Rec.Sport.Soccer Statistics Foundation
Official website  

First Football League (Croatia) seasons
Druga HNL
Cro